Glenn Sacha Theakston is a Magistrate of the Australian Capital Territory. He was appointed as a Magistrate on 30 May 2016 and Acting Chief Magistrate on 1 August 2019 following Lorraine Walker's appointment to the ACT Supreme Court as an Acting Judge.

Career 
In 1993, Theakston graduated from Macquarie University with a Bachelor of Laws and a Bachelor of Science.

In 1997, he worked at Legal Aid ACT as a solicitor.

Theakston was then appointed as National Coordinator of Counter-Terrorism at the Commonwealth Director of Public Prosecutions in 2006.

In 2012, Theakston was called to the bar. He practiced as a barrister in family and civil law in Canberra.

In August 2019, Chief Magistrate Lorraine Walker was appointed an Acting Judge of the Supreme Court for 12 months to establish the ACT's first Drug and Alcohol Court. Theakston was subsequently appointed Acting Chief Magistrate to fill the role in Walker's absence.

Personal life 
Theakston has been a reserve legal officer in the Royal Australian Air Force since 1993. He currently holds the rank of Wing commander.

References 

Magistrates of the Magistrates Court of the Australian Capital Territory
Living people
Year of birth missing (living people)
Australian magistrates